The Bambouto massif or Bamboutos Mountains is a group of volcanoes based on a swell in the Cameroon Volcanic Line, located in the Western High Plateau of Cameroon, merging in the north with the Oku Volcanic Field.

Geology
The large volcanic complex extends in a NE-SW direction for over 50 km, with the highest peaks rising to 2,679 m around the rim of a caldera with diameter 10 km.
Lava dating gives ages from 23 to 6 million years ago, with a lower basaltic series and an upper series of trachytes, trachyphonolites and phonolites.

Environment

The upper part of the massif above 2,000 m has a cool and cloudy climate with 2,510 mm of rainfall annually. Soils are acidic, low in phosphates and relatively infertile.
Due to population pressure, farming is carried out on the steep slopes, leading to erosion and further loss of fertility.
Cattle are also grazed on the upper slopes where foodcrop cultivation is uneconomical.

References

Volcanoes of Cameroon